M. M. Jacob (9 August 1926 – 8 July 2018), in full Mundakkal Mathew Jacob, was an Indian politician, working in Indian National Congress. He married Achamma Kunnuthara from Tiruvalla, Kerala (since deceased) and had four daughters. He was appointed Governor of Meghalaya in 1995 and again in 2000 for a second term. He also discharged the function of the Governor of Arunachal Pradesh as well for some time in 1996. He is longest serving governor of any Indian state. He served for more than 11 years.

Education 
He had his education in the University College, Trivandrum, Sacred Heart College, Thevara, Cochin, Loyola College, Madras, and the Lucknow University. He was a graduate in Law and had a master's degree in political science. He held a diploma in Income Tax Law as well. He did a course in social work in the University of Chicago, U.S.A.

Bharat Sevak Samaj functionary 
Jacob joined Bharat Sevak Samaj in 1954, which is a non-political voluntary organisation, with Prime Minister Jawaharlal Nehru as its president and Gulzarilal Nanda, Union Minister, as Chairman, commenced work to enlist public cooperation for India's planned development. Jacob served as Camp Director to train voluntary workers for the B.S.S. at the first such camp held in Kerala in 1954. Thereafter, he moved to the national capital Delhi and conducted Camp leaders' and Camp organisers' training programmes for almost two years. He also worked as Zonal Organiser for South India for "labour and social service camps for student and youth" - a scheme under the Union Ministry of Education. Later he took the assignment as Chairman, Bharat Sevak Samaj, Kerala State and Vice-Chairman, Central B.S.S. New Delhi.

Cooperative Movement 
Jacob played a leading role in the Cooperative Movement. He served as President of Kerala State Cooperative Rubber Marketing Federation (1975–1981). He also served as Director Kottayam District Cooperative Bank, Pala Rubber Marketing Cooperative Society and Director (later, Chairman) of Chitralekha Film Cooperative Society, Trivandrum for over a decade, with extensive experience in Boards and Corporations.

He was Chairman Kerala State owned Plantation Corporation, Ltd (1974–78) and the first Chairman of "Oil Palm India Ltd" (1977–1978). He served as a member of the Governing Board of Hindustan Latex (1975–78) (Govt. of India), the Indian Coffee Board (1973–75) and the Indian Rubber Board under the Commerce Ministry, Govt. of India for many years. He worked as Chairman National Alliance of Young Entrepreneurs, Kerala Branch (1974–76). He also served as Director of Indian Overseas Bank (1977–82) Kerala State Red Cross etc. He was in the State Tourist Advisory Board, Small Scale Industries Board (SISIS - 1975) etc. at the State level before being elected to the Parliament. Active in Y.M.C.A. movement, he served as Board Chairman of Management Y.M.C.A. Institute of Engineering Faridabad (1991–94).

As office-bearer of political party 
MM Jacob is a permanent invitee of the Congress Working Committee. He

ob has been given charge of party affairs in Jammu and KasKarnataka.ae is a elected member of AICC for many years.Hea, and elected member of AICC for maHenataka,He worked in Indian National Congress in various capacities - as General Secretary and Treasurer of Kerala Pradesh, Chairman, Kerala State Seva Dal board, Con.ala, and elected member of AICC for many years.

As Publisher/Editor etc. 
He published 'Bharat Sevak' a social worker's journal and was the Chief editor of 'Congress Review', fortnightly published from Trivandrum and the Managing Director of Veekshanam - a Malayalam daily newspaper published from Cochin. He has published several papers and articles in journals and periodicals. Besides, he has compiled and published a few books. He has presented many papers in national and international seminars in India and abroad.

In the Parliament of India 
Jacob was elected to the Rajya Sabha in 1982 and again in 1988. He served as Chairman, Committee on Subordinate Legislation (1984–85) and as the Chairman of the Parliament Standing Committee for the Ministry of Home Affairs (1993–94).
He was elected as Deputy Chairman Rajya Sabha in 1986, and later served as a Union Minister of State in the Ministries of Parliamentary Affairs, Water Resources and Home Affairs at different periods (during 1987–93).

Representing India in World Forums 
As a youth leader, he participated in the VI World Youth Festival in Moscow (1957) and the International Conference of Work Camp Leaders organised by UNESCO (1956). He led India's youth delegation to North Vietnam (1957) and later the Indian youth delegation to China (1957), youth delegate to Cleveland International Programme for youth leaders and social workers, USA (1963) and the International Conference of youth leaders from developing countries in Germany (BONN) in 1968. He was also delegate to International Seminar on 'Social Administration' in Western Reserve University, Cleveland, Ohio, USA (1976) and member of Indian delegation to Malaysia (Kuala Lumpur) for the International conference of natural Rubber Producing Countries (1975). He was the leader of the Indian Delegation to Sri Lanka for the 'International Conference of Natural Rubber Producing Countries' (1980).

Representing the Indian Parliament and the Commonwealth 
As Deputy Chairman Rajya Sabha, Jacob attended the Commonwealth Parliament conference in London in 1986. He was also leader of the Indian Parliamentary Delegation to Zaire in 1986 (now the Democratic Republic of the Congo), Leader of the Indian delegation to Inter-Parliamentary Union Conference in Budapest (1989) and a delegate at the Disarmament conference organised by Inter-Parliamentary Union and United Nations in Mexico (1985).

He attended the United Nations General Assembly, New York (1985 and again in 1993) and the Human Rights Conference held at the European Parliament in Strasbourg, France (1993).
He was a delegate to Human Rights Conference in Vienna, Austria organised by the U.N. (1994). He represented the Commonwealth Parliamentary Association (C.P.A.) in Accra, Ghana at the seminar of Ghana Parliamentarians (1993) and was a Commonwealth Observer monitoring the first post apartheid general election in South Africa in 1994.

Later activities 
Jacob had a keen interest in the traditional forms of local democracy in tribal areas, particularly in Meghalaya, and advocated a marriage of modernity and tradition to strengthen grassroots democracy in tribal areas.

He died on 8 July 2018 at the age of 91.

References

External links 
 

1926 births
2018 deaths
People from Kottayam district
Malayali politicians
Governors of Meghalaya
Indian National Congress politicians from Kerala
Deputy Chairman of the Rajya Sabha
Rajya Sabha members from Kerala
20th-century Indian politicians
Indian editors
Indian publishers (people)
Indian columnists
20th-century Indian journalists
Journalists from Kerala